Olumide Oyedeji (born 11 May 1981) is a Nigerian professional basketball center who played in the National Basketball Association (NBA) for three seasons.

Professional career
Oyedeji played at the 1999 and 2000 Nike Hoop Summits. He was selected by the Seattle SuperSonics, in the 2nd round (42nd overall) of the 2000 NBA Draft. He played a total of 93 games during 3 seasons in the NBA, and had career averages of 1.4 points per game, 2.1 rebounds per game, 0.1 assists per game, and 0.2 steals per game. His final NBA game was played on April 1st, 2003 in a 105 - 118 loss to the San Antonio Spurs where he recorded no stats. He also played in the Spanish League with Granada. 

Oyedeji played with Shanxi Zhongyu in the Chinese Basketball Association. He played with Changwon LG Sakers of the Korean Basketball League in 2011. However, he was released from the team, despite averaging 10.8 points, 15.0 rebounds, and 1.7 blocks per game. Oyedeji then signed on with the London Lions, who compete in the British Basketball League, in 2015.

National team
Oyedeji has been a member of the senior men's Nigerian national basketball team since 1997. He contributed immensely to his national team's participation at the FIBA Africa Nations Cup in 1997, 1999, 2001, 2003, 2005, 2007, 2011, 2013 and 2015. He led Nigeria to its first ever AfroBasket trophy in Tunisia in 2015. Oyedeji won silver medals in 1997, 1999 and 2003 respectively during the FIBA Africa Nations Cup. He won the bronze medal at the 2005 FIBA Africa Championship and 2011 FIBA Africa Championship. Oyedeji has represented his home country in the All Africa Games winning bronze in 1999, 2007 and 2015, silver in 2003 and gold in 2011. He also played at the FIBA World Cup in 1999 and at the 2012 Summer Olympics. Oyedeji is the inaugural African player to ever feature in all major basketball tournaments on the global stage, including Olympic Games, World Cup, Commonwealth Games, All Africa Games, NBA, Euro-League, and Asia Championships.

Oyedeji featured in the invitational tournament in South Africa where he captained the team and led them to victory in the finals. Nigeria's basketball team, D'Tigers, emerged overall winners of the 2015 Four Nations' invitational basketball tournament hosted by South Africa on Sunday 22 March 2015. Oyedeji, the long serving captain of the Nigerian Men's national team, emerged the MVP of the tournament. D'Tigers beat Mozambique 72-59 in their final game to win the inaugural tournament held at the Wembley Indoor Arena in Johannesburg. He retired from the Nigerian national basketball team several weeks before the 2016 Summer Olympics in Rio de Janeiro.

FIBA

The International Basketball Federation, FIBA, Central Board appointed Oyedeji, to the FIBA Players commission for the 2014-2019 term. Oyedeji's appointment resulted from his nomination by the Nigerian Basketball Federation in line with the criteria provided by the world governing body of basketball. He is expected to serve in the newly inaugurated FIBA Players commission under the chairmanship of former Serbian International and NBA great, Vlade Divac. Oyedeji is also a member of the board of the Nigeria Basketball Federation.

Personal life
Oyedeji had his secondary education at Loyola College, Ibadan where he started playing as a member of the school's senior basketball team.

Oyedeji is married to Adegoke Fajemisin. They have five children together.

References

1981 births
Living people
African Games bronze medalists for Nigeria
African Games medalists in basketball
Applied Science University basketball players
Atlanta Hawks players
Basketball players at the 2006 Commonwealth Games
Basketball players at the 2012 Summer Olympics
BC Dynamo Moscow players
Beijing Ducks players
Cangrejeros de Santurce basketball players
CB Granada players
Centers (basketball)
Changwon LG Sakers players
Commonwealth Games competitors for Nigeria
Competitors at the 2007 All-Africa Games
Juvecaserta Basket players
KK Olimpija players
Liaoning Flying Leopards players
Liga ACB players
Loyola College, Ibadan alumni
London Lions (basketball) players
National Basketball Association players from Nigeria
Nigerian expatriate basketball people in China
Nigerian expatriate basketball people in Germany
Nigerian expatriate basketball people in Italy
Nigerian expatriate basketball people in Japan
Nigerian expatriate basketball people in Spain
Nigerian expatriate basketball people in the United States
Olympic basketball players of Nigeria
Orlando Magic players
Qingdao Eagles players
Seattle SuperSonics draft picks
Seattle SuperSonics players
Seoul Samsung Thunders players
Shanxi Loongs players
Sportspeople from Ibadan
Utsunomiya Brex players
Yoruba sportspeople